Hambledon Rural District was a local government district that existed in south-west Surrey in England from 1894 until 1974. Its headquarters were in Haslemere. In 1974 it was combined with the Urban District of Farnham and Municipal Borough of Godalming to form the district of Waverley.

History of Surrey
Districts of England abolished by the Local Government Act 1972
Districts of England created by the Local Government Act 1894
Rural districts of England